Les Dennis's Home Video Heroes is a British television programme, which ran for two series on Challenge in 2008. The first series ran from 23 June to 1 August, and the second ran from 13 to 31 October. It featured humorous clips from home videos.  The show was narrated by Les Dennis, with a special "Laugh-o-meter" segment being narrated by Stuart Hall.

The show was repeated on Channel One (until that channel closed in 2011) and Living TV.

2008 British television series debuts
2008 British television series endings